The county of Oxfordshire is divided into five districts. The districts of Oxfordshire are Oxford, Cherwell, South Oxfordshire, Vale of White Horse, and West Oxfordshire.

As there are 694 Grade II* listed buildings in the county they have been split into separate lists for each district.

 Grade II* listed buildings in Cherwell (district)
 Grade II* listed buildings in Oxford
 Grade II* listed buildings in South Oxfordshire
 Grade II* listed buildings in Vale of White Horse
 Grade II* listed buildings in West Oxfordshire

See also
 Grade I listed buildings in Oxfordshire
 :Category:Grade II* listed buildings in Oxfordshire

References
National Heritage List for England

 
Oxfordshire
Lists of listed buildings in Oxfordshire